The amber-winged marsh glider, Hydrobasileus croceus, is a species of dragonfly in the family Libellulidae. It is a widely distributed species in many Asian countries.

Description and habitat
It is a large reddish-brown dragonfly with golden-amber tinted wings. Eyes are reddish-brown above, yellowish below. Its thorax is ohvaceous suffused with golden reddish-brown, Its base of hind-wings have a moderately broad dark reddish-brown mark. Abdomen  is olivaceous, changing to ochreous towards anal end, marked with black. Segments 4 to 9 have apical and basal dorsal black wedge-shaped spots.

It breeds in weedy ponds and lakes. The male is often seen patrolling over water, and rarely perches. When perched, they prefer to hang vertically on twigs inside dense shrubbery.

See also 
 List of odonates of Sri Lanka
 List of odonates of India
 List of odonata of Kerala

References

 croceus.html World Dragonflies
 Animal diversity web
 Query Results

Libellulidae
Insects described in 1867